= LDOC1L =

Protein-coding gene in the species Homo sapiens

RTL6

Identifiers
- Aliases: RTL6, Mar6, Mart6, dJ1033E15.2, LDOC1L, leucine zipper, down-regulated in cancer 1-like, leucine zipper, down-regulated in cancer 1 like, LDOC1 like, SIRH3, retrotransposon Gag like 6
- External IDs: MGI: 2675858; HomoloGene: 18594; GeneCards: RTL6; OMA:RTL6 - orthologs

Gene location (Human)
Chr.	Chromosome 22 (human)
Band	22q13.31	Start	44,492,583 bp
Band	22q13.31	End	44,498,233 bp

Gene location (Mouse)
Chr.	Chromosome 15 (mouse)
Band	15|15 E2	Start	84,437,599 bp
Band	15|15 E2	End	84,442,024 bp
RNA expression pattern
Bgee	Human / Mouse (ortholog); Top expressed in: endothelial cell; tibialis anterior muscle; mucosa of ileum; pancreatic epithelial cell; myocardium of left ventricle; ganglionic eminence; pancreatic ductal cell; cardiac muscle tissue of right atrium; middle temporal gyrus; ventricular zone / Top expressed in: saccule; otic vesicle; perirhinal cortex; entorhinal cortex; ganglionic eminence; CA3 field; medial ganglionic eminence; habenula; visual cortex; olfactory epithelium; More reference expression data
BioGPS	n/a
Orthologs
Species	Human	Mouse
Entrez	84247	223732
Ensembl	ENSG00000188636	ENSMUSG00000055745
UniProt	Q6ICC9	Q505G4
RefSeq (mRNA)	NM_032287	NM_177630
RefSeq (protein)	NP_115663	NP_808298
Location (UCSC)	Chr 22: 44.49 – 44.5 Mb	Chr 15: 84.44 – 84.44 Mb
PubMed search
- Wikidata
View/Edit Human	View/Edit Mouse

Leucine zipper, down-regulated in cancer 1 like is a protein that in humans is encoded by the LDOC1L gene.
